Unofficially Yours (stylized as ÜnOfficially Yours) is a 2012 Filipino romantic film directed by Cathy Garcia-Molina, starring John Lloyd Cruz and Angel Locsin with  Edgar Mortiz, Tetchie Agbayani and Edgar Allan Guzman as Kelvin. It was produced and released by Star Cinema. The film was released domestically on February 15, 2012. It was third highest grossing Filipino film of 2012.

Synopsis
Macky Galvez (John Lloyd Cruz) is a depressed young man recovering from a failed relationship. One night, Galvez meets Ces Bricenio (Angel Locsin),  a modern-day girl who is afraid of commitment, and they have a one-night stand. Later on, Macky meets Ces again in his new job as a reporter for Manila Bulletin.

Cast

John Lloyd Cruz as Dr. Mackie Galvez, DMD
Angel Locsin as Princess "Ces" Bricenio
Edgar Mortiz as Pedro Galvez
Tetchie Agbayani as Helen
Edgar Allan Guzman as Kelvin
Patrick Garcia as Vincent "Vince" Villegas
Melissa Mendez as Maria Galvez
Patrizha Martinez as Joana Galvez
Dannielle Martinez as Matthea Galvez
Dana Martinez as Lucy Galvez
K Brosas as Vivora
Ian De Leon as Duke
Boom Labrusca as Ipe
Hyubs Azarcon as Pong
Mel Kimura as Alex
Panying as Butch
Andi Manzano as Iya
Isabel de Leon as Manila Bulletin Lifestyle section Editor-in-Chief
Benjamin Domingo, Jr. as Office Janitor

Production

Development
Molina brainstormed the story back in 2009. In 2011, Star Cinema offered the main protagonists to Cruz and Locsin after their primetime TV Series that aired on ABS-CBN, Imortal. ÜnOfficially Yours was first announced in the now defunct showbiz news program, SNN: Showbiz News Ngayon. The film's tentative title was I Honestly Love You and later changed to ÜnOfficially Yours. The film's principal photography started September 21, 2011 in Batangas and in the headquarters of the Manila Bulletin in Manila.

Promotion
The full trailer was released during the previews of the Enteng Ng Ina Mo and Segunda Mano, films also produced by Star Cinema. The full trailer was televised on January 29, 2012 during Locsin and Cruz's guesting on the talk show, Gandang Gabi, Vice!. As a result, it became a worldwide trending topic on the social networking site, Twitter. The film became the front page cover of the February 15, 2012 issue of the Manila Bulletin during its premiere day.

Music
The film's official soundtrack is "If You Asked Me To" originally sung by Patti LaBelle, and was covered by Erik Santos and Angeline Quinto. The song's music video was released on Star Cinema's official YouTube account.

Reception

Critical response
UnOfficially Yours received generally positive reviews from local film critics. Ria Limjap of Spot.ph praised that the film is "entertaining and funny and poignant." Maureen Belmonte of Manila Bulletin wrote that the film is "worth watching" because it deals with modern-day themes. Noel Torre of Philippine Daily Inquirer praised the performance of the film's lead actors.

Box office
According to ABS-CBN News, the film opened with an P18.5 million gross nationwide. The film grossed P71.5 million at 140 screens on its first weekend of release beating out Ghost Rider: Spirit of Vengeance in the Philippine Box Office. 
On its second week, the film dropped 58.3% and grossed 29.8 million, bringing it a total of 113.5 million gross in two weeks. The film's gross income reached 144 million in the third week of showing. After a month, it had grossed P157.25 million at the box office.

ÜnOfficially Yours is currently the sixth highest grossing Filipino film of all time.

Release

Home media
The uncut version of ÜnOfficially Yours was released in original DVDs and VCDs on April 4, 2012.

International release
ÜnOfficially Yours had an international premiere night on February 24, 2012 in Los Angeles, CA in Alex Theatre. It will also be released in several key cities in the United States such as San Diego, CA, San Francisco, CA, Sacramento, CA, Dallas, TX, Houston, TX, Norfolk, VA, Aiea, HI, Park Ridge, IL, Las Vegas, NV, Bergenfield, NJ, and Seattle, WA.

Television premiere
The film had its television premiere on December 16, 2012 in the cable channel Cinema One.

Awards

References

External links
 
 A Movie Review for Unofficially Yours

2012 films
Films directed by Cathy Garcia-Molina
2010s Tagalog-language films
Star Cinema films
2010s English-language films